Little India is a common name for an ethnic enclave of Indian expatriates abroad. 

Little India may also refer to:

Media
 Little India (magazine), periodical started in 1991

Places
 While most "Little India" enclaves have different names, a few are specifically named as so:

Canada
 Gerrard India Bazaar, also known as the Little India 
Malaysia
 Little India, Ipoh
 Little India, Malacca
 Little India, Penang
Singapore
 Little India, Singapore
United States
 Little India, Artesia, California
 Little India, Edison/Iselin